The Kunshan South railway station is a railway station on the Jinghu High-Speed Railway and the Huning Intercity Rail. The station is located in Kunshan City, Jiangsu, China.

The Kunshan South Station has 2 platforms and 6 tracks on the Shanghai–Nanjing Intercity Railway, as well as  2 platforms and 6 tracks on the Beijing–Shanghai High-Speed Railway. (The two rail lines have the same track alignment in the central Kunshan City). The new station is located about a kilometer to the south from the Kunshan Station on the "old" Jinghu Railway.

History
The construction of the station started on  July 21, 2009. The Station opened on July 1, 2010.

References

Railway stations in Jiangsu
Railway stations in Suzhou
Railway stations in China opened in 2010
Stations on the Beijing–Shanghai High-Speed Railway
Stations on the Shanghai–Nanjing Intercity Railway